Blue Earth County is a county in the State of Minnesota. As of the 2020 census, the population was 69,112. Its county seat is Mankato. The county is named for the Blue Earth River and for the deposits of blue-green clay once evident along the banks of the Blue Earth River.

Blue Earth County is part of the Mankato-North Mankato metropolitan area.

History

The area of Blue Earth County was once occupied by the Dakota Indians. French explorer Pierre-Charles Le Sueur was an early explorer in this area, arriving where the Minnesota and Blue Earth rivers meet. He made an unsuccessful attempt to mine copper from the blue earth. The area remained under French control until 1803 when it passed to the United States in the Louisiana Purchase.

When Minnesota became a territory in 1849, the territorial government became interested in settling the river valley. In 1850 the first steamboat trip, starting in St. Paul, traveled on the Minnesota River and came to the Blue Earth River. The first Euro-American settlers, P. K. Johnson and Henry Jackson, debarked and settled in present-day Mankato. The ratification of the Mendota and Traverse des Sioux treaties in 1851 effectively forced the eastern Dakota to move to nearby reservations.

The county of Blue Earth was created after a division of the Minnesota Territory on March 5, 1853, from portions of Dakota County and free territory. It was named for the Blue Earth River. The first government officials were appointed by Alexander Ramsey, the territorial governor. That October the first election was held, with 22 ballots being taken.

On February 27, 1855, the Winnebago (Ho-Chunk) ceded 897,900 acres of their reservation near Long Prairie in exchange for 200,000 acres on the Blue Earth River. On May 24, 1855, they relocated and became so successful at farming that neighboring American settlers coveted their land. 

Blue Earth County is near the Lower Sioux reservation, which was created in 1858. Starvation on the reservation and the lack of timely arrival of government annuities led to the Dakota War of 1862, followed by removal of all Native Americans from the county. In 1868 the railroad's arrival promoted the county's growth and development by bringing immigrants and goods to the area.

Geography
The Minnesota River flows southeasterly along the western part of the county's northern boundary line. It is joined by the Blue Earth River, which flows northerly through the western central part of the county. The Watonwan River flows northwesterly through the northeastern part of the county, discharging into the Blue Earth. The Little Cobb River flows northwesterly through the southeastern part of the county, meeting with the Cobb River which flows northerly through the lower part of the county into the Blue Earth River. The Le Sueur River also flows west-northwesterly through the SE part of the county, discharging into the Blue Earth River.

The county terrain consists of low rolling hills, with the area (except around built-up zones, and in areas carved by runoff) devoted to agriculture. It slopes generally to the north.  Its southwest corner is 1,086' (331m) above sea level.

The Blue Earth River and Le Sueur River flow through a part of the county. The land surface is relatively flat with over 30 lakes in the county. There are many "closed forest savannas" that some call the big woods in the county's northeast. The rivers that flow out of the northeast are surrounded by these big woods. Most of the county is grassland prairie but scattered parts are wet prairie. Some spots that surround the rivers are oak openings and barren brushland.

Major highways

  U.S. Highway 14
  U.S. Highway 169
  Minnesota State Highway 22
  Minnesota State Highway 30
  Minnesota State Highway 60
  Minnesota State Highway 68
  Minnesota State Highway 83

Lakes

 Crystal Lake
 Albert Lake
 Alice Lake
 Armstrong Lake
 Ballantyne Lake
 Born Lake
 Cottonwood Lake
 Duck Lake
 Eagle Lake
 George Lake
 Gilfillin Lake
 Ida Lake
 Indian Lake
 Knights Lake
 Lake Crystal
 Lieberg Lake
 Lily Lake
 Long Lake
 Loon Lake
 Lura Lake (part)
 Madison Lake
 Mennenga Lake
 Mills Lake
 Minnesota Lake (part)
 Mud Lake
 Perch Lake
 Porter Lake
 Rice Lake
 Severson Lake
 Strom Lake
 Wita Lake

Adjacent counties

 Nicollet County - north
 Le Sueur County - northeast
 Waseca County - east
 Faribault County - south
 Martin County - southwest
 Watonwan County - west
 Brown County - northwest

Climate and weather

Demographics

2000 census
As of the 2000 census, the county had 55,941 people, 21,062 households, and 12,616 families. The population density was 74.8/sq mi (28.9/km2). There were 21,971 housing units at an average density of 29.4/sqmi (11.3/km2). The county's racial makeup was 94.96% White, 1.19% Black or African American, 0.28% Native American, 1.79% Asian, 0.06% Pacific Islander, 0.69% from other races, and 1.03% from two or more races. 1.77% of the population were Hispanic or Latino of any race. 47.6% were of German, 13.6% Norwegian and 6.5% Irish ancestry.

There were 21,062 households, of which 29.10% had children under the age of 18 living with them, 48.60% were married couples living together, 7.80% had a female householder with no husband present, and 40.10% were non-families. 27.10% of all households were made up of individuals, and 9.50% had someone living alone who was 65 years of age or older. The average household size was 2.46 and the average family size was 2.99.

21.40% of the county's population was under the age of 18, 22.10% were from age 18 to 24, 25.60% were from age 25 to 44, 18.80% were from age 45 to 64, and 12.10% were age 65 or older. The median age was 30 years. For every 100 females, there were 99.10 males. For every 100 females age 18 and over, there were 97.40 males.

The county's median household income was $38,940, and the median family income was $50,257. Males had a median income of $32,087 versus $22,527 for females. The county's per capita income was $18,712. About 6.10% of families and 12.90% of the population were below the poverty line, including 10.50% of those under age 18 and 9.40% of those age 65 or over.

2020 Census

Communities

Cities

 Amboy
 Eagle Lake
 Good Thunder
 Lake Crystal
 Madison Lake
 Mankato
 Mapleton
 Minnesota Lake (partial)
 North Mankato (partial)
 Pemberton
 Saint Clair
 Skyline
 Vernon Center

Census-designated place
 Garden City

Unincorporated communities
 Cambria
 Marysburg
 Perth
 Smiths Mill

Townships

 Beauford Township
 Butternut Valley Township
 Cambria Township
 Ceresco Township
 Danville Township
 Decoria Township
 Garden City Township
 Jamestown Township
 Judson Township
 Le Ray Township
 Lime Township
 Lincoln Township
 Lyra Township
 Mankato Township
 Mapleton Township
 McPherson Township
 Medo Township
 Pleasant Mound Township
 Rapidan Township
 Shelby Township
 South Bend Township
 Sterling Township
 Vernon Center Township

Government and politics
As of 2020, Blue Earth County has voted for the winning presidential candidate in 13 of the last 15 elections, the exceptions being 1988 and 2004. Since 1988 it has tilted toward the Democratic Party, but in 2000 and 2016 it voted for the Republican candidates. Despite voting for Trump in 2016, the county voted for Joe Biden in 2020. Blue Earth County is considered a college town due to the presence of Minnesota State University in Mankato.

See also
 National Register of Historic Places listings in Blue Earth County, Minnesota

References

External links
 Blue Earth County Government’s website

 
Minnesota counties
Mankato – North Mankato metropolitan area
1853 establishments in Minnesota Territory
Populated places established in 1853
Welsh-American culture in Minnesota